Dobbie is a surname of Scottish origin. Notable people with the surname include:

Alexander Williamson Dobbie (1843–1912), engineer and retailer in South Australia
Allison Dobbie MNZM, New Zealand librarian
Dane Dobbie (born 1986), Canadian lacrosse player
Dorothy Dobbie (born 1945), Canadian politician
James Johnston Dobbie (1852–1924), known for the isolation, chemical structure, and physical properties of alkaloids
Joseph Dobbie, Liberal MP for Ayr Burghs (UK Parliament constituency) from 1904 to 1906
Stephen Dobbie (born 1982), Scottish professional footballer for Queen of the South 
Thomas William Dobbie (1829–1908), Canadian civil engineer, provincial land surveyor and political figure
William Dobbie GCMG, KCB, DSO (1879–1964), British Army veteran of the Second Boer War, and First and Second World Wars
William Dobbie (politician) CBE (1878–1950), British Labour politician

See also
Dobbie or Dobby, a type of fairground roundabout that has no floor, with its ride-on figures being suspended from its roof
Dobbie Literary Award
Dobby (disambiguation)

References

Surnames of Scottish origin
de:Dobbie